The Birch Wood is a 1970 Polish drama film directed by Andrzej Wajda based on a novel by Jarosław Iwaszkiewicz. It was entered into the 7th Moscow International Film Festival where Wajda won the Golden Prize for Direction and Daniel Olbrychski won the award for Best Actor.

Cast 
Olgierd Łukaszewicz - Stanislaw
Daniel Olbrychski - Boleslaw
Emilia Krakowska - Malina
Marek Perepeczko - Michal
Elzbieta Zolek - Ola
Danuta Wodyńska - Katarzyna

References

External links
 

1970 films
1970 drama films
Films directed by Andrzej Wajda
Films based on Polish novels
Polish drama films
1970s Polish-language films